The Tupolev Samolyot 135 was a designation that was used for two different strategic bomber projects in the Soviet Union in the late 1950s and early 1960s, neither of which progressed beyond the drawing board.

Design and development
The first, proposed in 1958, was for a Tupolev Tu-95 derivative carrying a long-range cruise-missile, to be based on the Tsybin RS (S-30), Tupolev Samolyot 100 or Tupolev Samolyot 113 missiles.

Two years later the second iteration of '135' was envisioned as a supersonic interdiction bomber powered by a variety of engines in many configurations, including as a nuclear-powered bomber. The design settled to a canard delta, similar to the North American XB-70A Valkyrie, with paired Kuznetsov NK-6 turbofan engine nacelles under each wing and a large single fin. Weapons would largely have been missiles, as designed, for maritime interdiction as well as long-range interdiction of enemy logistics. The design was constantly evolving and gave Tupolev valuable experience which would assist in the later design of the Tupolev Tu-22M and Tupolev Tu-160 bombers.

Further development of the '135 was suspended when the Sukhoi T-4 became the favoured outcome of the design efforts in the early 1960s,as well as high estimated cost of the '135'. Variants that were studied included: the 135K maritime strike / interdiction; '135P'  supersonic transport (SST); a reconnaissance variant with cameras and ELINT equipment.

Specifications (estimated)

References

External links 
 
 

Tu-0160
1960s Soviet bomber aircraft
Quadjets
Low-wing aircraft
Delta-wing aircraft
Variable-sweep-wing aircraft
Abandoned military aircraft projects of the Soviet Union